, alternately known in English-language releases as Gamba 3D and Air Bound, is a 2015 Japanese 3D CG animated adventure film directed by Tomohiro Kawamura and Yoshihiro Komori, produced by Tetsu Fujimura, Kenichiro Hayafune, Avi Arad and Barry Brooker, and written by Ryota Kosawa. It is based on the 1972 novel  by Atsuo Saitō and is a remake of the 1975 anime series Gamba no Bouken. It was released in Japan on October 10, 2015. An English-language version was released by SC Films International under the title Gamba 3D in 2015, while retaining the original Japanese names of the characters. Another English-language version was later released in the United States by Lionsgate and Grindstone Entertainment Group under the title Air Bound in 2017 that changed the Japanese names of the characters to English names.

Plot 
Gamba, a brave and adventurous city mouse from Tokyo, embarks on a sailing journey with his childhood friend Mampuku, in order to realize his dream of reaching the sea. On board they encounter ship mice and Chūta, a mouse who has been injured and is seeking help. He appeals for Gamba and Mampuku to assist him in defending the island of Yumemishima and its mouse colony from the invading Noroi Clan, a large murderous army of weasels, led by their psychopathic and bloodthirsty leader Noroi. Gamba elects to sail to Yumemishima with Chūta to help defend the island, and Gamba recruits more mice to join their cause on the island.

Characters 
 
 The city mouse, who calls himself . He is always energetic, full of curiosity, and has a strong sense of justice. He takes a trip to show the sea to his close friend Mampuku, and meets Chūta at the harbor when they arrive. Gamba and his friends are out on a journey to heed the wishes of Chūta, to defeat Noroi who rules Noroi Island. He is renamed Gavin in Lionsgate's English film dub.

 
 The Gamba's best friend. He is a gluttonous and an easygoing town mouse. His name is the result of him being absentminded. He is renamed Matthew in Lionsgate's English film dub.

 
 The kind-hearted captain of sailor mice. He has a daughter named Yuri, is very dependable and is calmer than Gamba. He lost his right eye to Noroi. He is renamed Rusty in Lionsgate's English film dub.

 
 One of Yoisho's childhood friends. He is knowledgeable, clever, wears big glasses and has quite a short tail. He is renamed Grayson in Lionsgate's English film dub.

 
 The wandering doctor mouse. Every time he gets drunk, he reads poetry out loud. He also has sensitive ears that pick up sound the other mice cannot hear.

 
 He is a gambler and good at fraud. He is also called a "swift runner" because he is light-footed. He is renamed Ace in Lionsgate's English film dub.

 
 An island mouse who comes to the city for help. He is a younger brother of Shioji. He is renamed Chester in Lionsgate's English film dub.

 
 The leader weasel with snow-white fur and light blue eyes. He is a cruel and bloodthirsty killer and when his blue eyes shine eerily in the dark, he can apply hypnotism to lure his victims. He is renamed Winston in Lionsgate's English film dub.

 
 The granddaughter of the elder mouse Shuro from Yumemishima, and is an older sister of Chūta. She is renamed Shelly in Lionsgate's English film dub.

 
 The traveler mouse who is on his way home from a ten year trip. He uses Gamba to avoid danger. He is modeled on Torajirō of "Otoko wa Tsurai yo."

 
 The leader of the streaked shearwaters. Many members of her flock and their eggs were slaughtered by Noroi and his clan. At first reluctant, she helps the mice in their battle against the Noroi Clan. She is renamed Theresa in Lionsgate's English dub.

Voice cast 

Additional voices:

 English (Lionsgate/ Bang Zoom! Entertainment): Amanda Celine Miller, Chris Hackney, Damien Haas, Dave Mallow, David W. Collins, Dorah Fine, Dorothy Elias-Fahn, Doug Stone, Erika Harlacher, Janice Kawaye, Jason Linere White, Jay Preston, Joseph J. Thomas, Kaiji Tang, Katelyn Gault, Keith Silverstein, Kyle Hebert, Lex Lang, Mark Whiten, Philece Sampler, Vernon Dew, Zeno Robinson

Music 

The soundtrack album titled Gamba (Original Motion Picture Soundtrack) was composed and conducted by the British film score composer and conductor Benjamin Wallfisch. It was produced by the record label Varèse Sarabande and released on February 1, 2016. The album has 22 tracks with a total length of 62:16 minutes.

References

External links 
  
 
 
 
 

2015 anime films
2010s adventure films
Adventure anime and manga
Animated adventure films
2010s Japanese-language films
2010s English-language films
Animated films about mice
Films about weasels
Animated films about birds
Animated films set in Tokyo
Animated films set on islands